Thomas Lennart Bodström (born 9 April 1962) is a Swedish former politician of the Swedish Social Democratic Party. He is also a former footballer, and is best remembered for representing Allsvenskan side AIK between 1987 and 1989.

Political career 
Thomas Bodström was the Swedish Minister for Justice in the two last succeeding governments of the Swedish Prime Minister Göran Persson, from 2000 to 2006. From October 2006 until October 2010, he was the chairman of the Riksdag committee for judicial issues. When the new parliament, that was elected in 2010, was inaugurated, Bodström lost his position as a committee chairman. Bodström shortly afterwards requested half-time leave of absence from his seat in the parliament, combined with half-time parental leave, in order to relocate to the USA together with his family. His request for leave of absence was denied by the Social Democratic group leader in the parliament, and Bodström has thus left his seat in the Parliament. His part-time parental leave was already granted from the Swedish Social Insurance Administration. Thomas Bodström is also active as the chairman of the children's rights organization ECPAT Sweden.

Thomas Bodström is the son of Lennart Bodström, who was Swedish Minister for Foreign Affairs from 1982 to 1985 in the Olof Palme government. In his youth, however, Thomas Bodström was not involved in party politics. Instead, his first brush with media attention came as a football player in AIK, a team in the Premier Division of the Swedish Football league, 1987–1989. In 1990, he graduated from Stockholm University with a Degree of Master of Laws, LL.M. After that, he worked as a lawyer for ten years. During his career, he took interest in international affairs, and in 1999, he joined the board of the Swedish branch of the international organisation Lawyers Without Borders.

However, when Prime Minister Göran Persson announced his new cabinet appointment on 11 October 2000, Bodström was a completely unknown face to most of the political journalists attending the press conference. At the time, he was not even a member of the Social Democratic Party. Although Bodström was unaccustomed to national politics at the time, he has managed to keep his job, despite calls for his resignation, especially loudly voiced after several high-profile prison breaks during the summer of 2004.

He has written a book, 700 dagar i Rosenbad (700 days in Rosenbad), about his experiences as a newcomer in the government.

Controversy
At the time of his appointment, Bodström revealed in an interview that he had used hashish in his youth, and also, that he on several occasions had employed a person in his home without paying the appropriate taxes.

During his term in office, Bodström was heavily criticized by advocates of privacy and liberal think tanks, as he is said to have worked towards giving the police the possibility of monitoring people who might be involved in minor crimes, as well as other things that could be seen as intrusive to privacy.

On 23 August 2010, during an interview by Swedish Radio, in light of the current drug testing debate, the reporter asked Bodström if he was willing to participate in a drug test. Bodström at first agreed, but when the nurse explained that he would be tested for amphetamines, hashish, opiates, and benzodiazepines, he changed his mind, and said, "I don't feel like doing it now. I am sweating too much."

The Pirate Party defended his right not to take the test in reference to their views on privacy.

Since mid-2011, Bodström has been an expert commentator on law on the crime reality TV show Efterlyst on TV3.

Football career
Bodström played professional football in the 1980s as a defender and represented Allsvenskan club AIK between 1987 and 1989, making a total of 48 league appearances and scoring three goals for the club. Prior to representing AIK, he also played for Spånga IS and Enköpings SK FK.

Career statistics

Bibliography
(2004) 700 dagar i Rosenbad Biography, Albert Bonniers Förlag, .
(2008) Rymmaren crime fiction, Norstedts Förlag
(2009) Idealisten crime fiction, Norstedts Förlag
(2010) Lobbyisten crime fiction, Norstedts Förlag
(2013) Populisten
(2014) Det man minns

References

1962 births
Living people
People from Uppsala
People from Sollentuna Municipality
Association football defenders
Swedish footballers
Spånga IS players
AIK Fotboll players
20th-century Swedish lawyers
Swedish Ministers for Justice
Members of the Riksdag from the Social Democrats
Stockholm University alumni
Members of the Riksdag 2002–2006